Cleveland Tigers may refer to:
Cleveland Tigers (baseball), a 1920s Negro league baseball team
Cleveland Tigers (NFL), a 1920s APFA/NFL football team